Paul Dorrance Sones was a United States Paralympic athlete. In the first 1960 Summer Paralympics he competed and medaled in multiple sports including archery, swimming and wheelchair basketball.

References

Archers at the 1960 Summer Paralympics
Swimmers at the 1960 Summer Paralympics
Wheelchair basketball players at the 1960 Summer Paralympics
Paralympic gold medalists for the United States
Paralympic silver medalists for the United States
Paralympic bronze medalists for the United States
1936 births
2015 deaths
Paralympic medalists in archery
Paralympic medalists in wheelchair basketball
Paralympic medalists in swimming
Medalists at the 1960 Summer Paralympics
Paralympic wheelchair basketball players of the United States
Paralympic archers of the United States
20th-century American people